Desmond Tolton Horne (12 December 1939 – 20 July 2015) was a South African footballer who played as a left-sided winger. He played in the English top flight for Wolverhampton Wanderers, with whom he won the 1960 FA Cup, as well as Blackpool.

Career
Horne was signed by English First Division club Wolverhampton Wanderers in 1956. He was a member of their 1958 FA Youth Cup-winning side before making his first team debut in the following season as Wolves retained the league championship.

The 1959–60 season was his best with the club, making 36 appearances in total - including playing in the European Cup  - and scoring 11 times. The campaign ended with Horne playing in the 1960 FA Cup Final where Wolves defeated Blackburn Rovers 3-0 at Wembley. The winger had an assist in this victory as he crossed for Norman Deeley to head in the second goal.

The next year saw Horne less prominent at Molineux and he was transferred to Blackpool in March 1961. Horne remained with the Seasiders for five full seasons (all in the top flight), making over 120 appearances in the process.

He returned to his native South Africa to play for the Southern Suburbs in 1966.

Death 
He died aged 75 on 20 July 2015.

Literature

References

1939 births
2015 deaths
South African soccer players
Expatriate footballers in England
English Football League players
Wolverhampton Wanderers F.C. players
Blackpool F.C. players
Association football outside forwards
Southern Suburbs F.C. players
Powerlines F.C. players
FA Cup Final players